Eric Molebatsi is a Botswanan former footballer. He hails from the Letlhakeng sub-district of Botswana and was active up till 2011. Between 2002 and 2004, he also played for the Botswana national football team.

Playing career 
Molebatsi began his playing career in 2002 during which he played for clubs such NICO FC (2007-2009 as ,Motlakase (2010). He also represented Botswana at the 2004 COSAFA Cup. He last played for Satmos FC in 22011 after which he retired

See also 
Botswana National Football team
COSAFA Cup

References

External links 
 
COSAFA Cup website

Living people
Association football midfielders
Botswana footballers
Nico United players
Botswana international footballers
Gilport Lions F.C. players
TAFIC F.C. players
Year of birth missing (living people)